Marta Gastón Menal (born 2 February 1973) is a Spanish politician. She is a member of the Congress of Deputies for the Spanish Socialist Workers' Party (PSOE).

Gastón graduated in economics, and worked as a business manager for a bank. She was elected to the Senate of Spain for the province of Huesca in the 2004 election, and to the Huesca municipal council in the 2007 election. In the 2008 election, she opted for the Congress of Deputies rather than the Senate and was elected as second on the PSOE list for Huesca.

References

1973 births
Living people
People from Huesca
Members of the 9th Congress of Deputies (Spain)
Members of the Senate of Spain
Spanish Socialist Workers' Party politicians